Sierra Leone competed at the 2016 Summer Olympics in Rio de Janeiro, Brazil, from 5 to 21 August 2016. This was the nation's eleventh appearance at the Summer Olympics since its debut in 1968, except for two occasions. Sierra Leone failed to register any athletes at the 1972 Summer Olympics in Munich, and also joined the rest of the African nations to boycott the 1976 Summer Olympics in Montreal.

Four athletes, two per gender, were selected to the Sierra Leone team for the Games, competing only in both athletics and swimming (the country's Olympic debut in Rio de Janeiro). 18-year-old freestyle swimmer Bunturabie Jalloh became the second female athlete to carry the Sierra Leonean flag in the opening ceremony at successive Games, after long jumper Ola Sesay performed the duty in London four years earlier. Sierra Leone, however, has yet to win its first ever Olympic medal.

Athletics

Sierre Leone has received universality slots from IAAF to send two athletes (one male and one female) to the Olympics.

Track & road events

Swimming

Sierra Leone has received a Universality invitation from FINA to send two swimmers (one male and one female) to the Olympics, signifying the nation's Olympic return to the sport for the first time since 1996.

References

External links 

 

Nations at the 2016 Summer Olympics
2016
Olympics